Scorpions are a German rock band formed in Hanover in 1965 by guitarist Rudolf Schenker. Since the band's inception, its musical style has ranged from hard rock, heavy metal and glam metal to soft rock. The lineup from 1978 to 1992 was the most successful incarnation of the group, and included Klaus Meine (vocals), Rudolf Schenker (rhythm guitar), Matthias Jabs (lead guitar), Francis Buchholz (bass), and Herman Rarebell (drums). The band's only continuous member has been Schenker, although Meine has appeared on all of Scorpions' studio albums, while Jabs has been a consistent member since 1978, and bassist Paweł Mąciwoda and drummer Mikkey Dee have been in the band since 2003 and 2016 respectively.

During the mid-1970s, with guitarist Uli Jon Roth (who replaced Schenker's younger brother Michael) part of the lineup, the music of the Scorpions was defined as hard rock. After Roth's departure in 1978, Schenker and Meine took control of the group, giving them almost all the power to compose music and write lyrics. Matthias Jabs joined in 1978, and with the melodic rock he played and the influence of producer Dieter Dierks in the band, the Scorpions changed their sound to melodic heavy metal mixed with lyrical "power rock ballads", which is evident in the album Lovedrive (1979), which began the evolution of the band's sound, with recording a developed later in several of their albums. Michael Schenker also played on the Lovedrive album. Over the next decade, the band achieved influence, approval from music critics, and significant commercial success with the albums Animal Magnetism (1980), Blackout (1982), Love at First Sting (1984), the live recording World Wide Live (1985), Savage Amusement (1988), their best-selling compilation Best of Rockers 'n' Ballads (1989), and Crazy World (1990), all awarded at least one platinum award in the United States. The band has released thirteen consecutive studio albums that were in the top 10 in Germany, one of which reached No. 1, as well as three consecutive albums that were in the top 10 in the Billboard 200 in the United States. Their latest studio album, Rock Believer, was released in February 2022.

Scorpions are estimated to have sold over 100 million records around the world, making them one of the best-selling hard rock and heavy metal bands. One of their most recognized hits is "Wind of Change" (from Crazy World), a symbolic anthem of the political changes in Eastern Europe in the late 1980s and early 1990s and the fall of the Berlin Wall, and it remains as one of the best-selling singles in the world with over 14 million copies. Two of the songs on their ninth studio album Love at First Sting, "Rock You Like a Hurricane" and "Still Loving You", are regarded as some of the most influential and popular works, both in heavy metal music and among rock ballads, defined as "rock anthem" and "a true hymn of love".

History

Formation and early history (1965–1973)
Rudolf Schenker, the band's rhythm guitarist, launched the band in 1965. At first, the band had Merseybeat influences and Schenker himself handled the vocals. He played in a band with Lothar Heimberg before he founded Scorpions. Karl Heinz Vollmer left the band in 1967 because of his military obligations, then he could not associate anymore with the concerts and the military life. Things began to come together in 1970 when Schenker's younger brother Michael and vocalist Klaus Meine, who had played together in the Led Zeppelin and Taste cover band Copernicus, joined the band. With this line-up they won a music contest in 1972 and recorded two songs for a single that was never released on the CCA label, but the songs, "Action" and "I'm Going Mad" were later released on different compilation albums including Psychedelic Gems 2

In 1972, the group recorded and released their debut album Lonesome Crow, with Lothar Heimberg on bass and Wolfgang Dziony on drums and re-recorded versions of their CCA songs. During the Lonesome Crow tour, the Scorpions opened for up-and-coming British band UFO. Near the end of the tour, guitarist Michael Schenker accepted an offer of lead guitar for UFO. Uli Jon Roth, a friend of Michael's, was then introduced to the band and he helped them to finish off the tour.

The departure of Michael Schenker led to the breakup of the band. In 1973, Uli Roth, who had helped the Scorpions complete the Lonesome Crow tour, was offered the role as lead guitarist, but turned the band down, preferring instead to remain in the band Dawn Road. Rudolf Schenker eventually decided he wanted to work with Roth, but did not want to resurrect the last Scorpions lineup. He attended some of Dawn Road's rehearsals and ultimately decided to join the band, which consisted of Roth, Francis Buchholz (bass), Achim Kirschning (keyboards) and Jürgen Rosenthal (drums). Uli Roth and Buchholz persuaded Rudolf Schenker to invite Klaus Meine to join on vocals, which he soon did. While there were more members of Dawn Road than Scorpions in the band, they decided to use the Scorpions name because it was well known in the German hard rock scene and an album had been released under that name.

Rise to fame (1974–1978)
In 1974, the new line-up released Fly to the Rainbow. The album proved to be more successful than Lonesome Crow and songs such as "Speedy's Coming" and the title track established the band's sound. Achim Kirschning decided to leave after the recordings. Soon after, Jürgen Rosenthal had to leave as he was drafted into the army. In 1976, he joined German progressive rock band Eloy recording three albums. He was replaced in July 1974 by Jürgen Fechter. In 1975, Rudy Lenners from Belgium became the next drummer.

That year, the band released In Trance, which marked the beginning of their long collaboration with German producer Dieter Dierks. The album was a huge step forward for the Scorpions and established their heavy metal formula. It garnered a fan base at home and abroad with cuts such as "In Trance", "Dark Lady" and "Robot Man".

Meanwhile, as "The Hunters", the band recorded "Fuchs geh' voran" and "Wenn es richtig losgeht", German cover versions of "Action" and "Fox on the Run" by the Sweet for EMI's Electrola label.

In 1976, the Scorpions released Virgin Killer, the album cover of which featured a nude prepubescent girl behind a broken pane of glass. The cover art was designed by Stefan Bohle, who was the product manager for RCA Records, their label at the time. The cover brought the band considerable market exposure but was subsequently pulled or replaced in other countries. The album itself garnered widespread praise for its music from select critics and fan base. In 2008, the cover art on the English Wikipedia was briefly blacklisted by the Internet Watch Foundation, before reversing their decision 4 days later.

The following year, Rudy Lenners resigned for personal reasons and was replaced by Herman Rarebell, an experienced musician who had recorded with the bands Missus Beastly and Onyx.

For the follow-up Taken by Force, RCA Records made a determined effort to promote the album in stores and on the radio. The album's single, "Steamrock Fever", was added to some of RCA's radio promotional records. Roth was not happy with the commercial direction the band was taking. Although he performed on the band's Japan tour, he departed to form his own band, Electric Sun prior to the release of the resultant double live album Tokyo Tapes. Tokyo Tapes was released in the US and Europe six months after its Japanese release. By that time in mid-1978, after auditioning around 140 guitarists, the Scorpions recruited Matthias Jabs, a veteran of the German rock scene who had played in the bands Lady and Fargo.

Commercial success (1978–1992)
Following the addition of Jabs, Scorpions left RCA for Mercury Records in the United States and Harvest/EMI Electrola worldwide to record their next album Lovedrive. Just weeks after quitting UFO, Michael Schenker returned to the group for a short period during the recordings for the album. This gave the band three guitarists. Lovedrive was an album that some critics consider to be the pinnacle of their career. Containing such fan favourites as "Loving You Sunday Morning", "Always Somewhere", "Holiday" and the instrumental "Coast to Coast", it firmly cemented the "Scorpions formula" of hard rock songs mixed with melodic ballads. Although it had been widely believed for decades that Michael Schenker's contribution to the record was only limited to three songs, he vehemently maintained he appeared on the whole album during an interview with satellite radio host Eddie Trunk. The album's provocative artwork was named "Best album sleeve of 1979" by Playboy magazine, yet ultimately changed for American release. Lovedrive reached No. 55 on the US charts, demonstrating that the band was gathering an international following. After the completion and release of the album the band decided to retain Michael in the band, forcing Jabs to leave. However, in April 1979, during their tour in France, Michael quit again and Jabs was brought in permanently to replace him.

In 1980, the band released Animal Magnetism, again with a provocative cover this time showing a girl kneeling and a Doberman Pinscher sitting in front of a man. Animal Magnetism contained classics such as "The Zoo" and "Make It Real". Soon after the album's release, Meine began experiencing throat problems. He required surgery on his vocal cords and doubts were raised about whether he would ever sing again.

Meanwhile, the band began working on their next album, Blackout in 1981. Don Dokken was brought in to provide guide and backing vocals while Meine recovered. Meine eventually healed completely and was able to finish the album. Blackout was released in 1982 and quickly became the band's best selling album to date, eventually going platinum. Meine's voice showed no signs of weakness and fan response to the album was good. Blackout spawned two singles: "No One Like You" and "Can't Live Without You".

Gaining in popularity from the success of Blackout, the Scorpions performed to over 375,000 fans on Day 2 at the three-day US Festival concert held in San Bernardino, California during Memorial Day Weekend of 1983. The concert was aired live on MTV, giving the band wide exposure in a live show.

The 1984 album Love at First Sting cemented the Scorpions' status as an internationally popular band. Propelled by the single "Rock You Like a Hurricane", Love at First Sting climbed the charts and went double platinum in the USA a few months after its release.

MTV gave the album's videos "Rock You Like a Hurricane", "Bad Boys Running Wild", "Big City Nights", and the power ballad "Still Loving You" significant airtime, greatly contributing to the album's success. The channel even supplied Scorpions with the nickname "The Ambassadors of Rock", to the chagrin of industry insiders who recognized the executive influence behind the scenes. Rolling Stone magazine named them "The Heroes of Heavy Metal".

The band toured extensively behind Love at First Sting and released their second live album, World Wide Live in 1985. Recorded over a year-long world tour and released at the height of their popularity, the album was another success for the band, peaking at No. 14 in the charts in the US and at No. 18 in the UK.

After their extensive world tours, the band finally returned to the studio to record Savage Amusement. Released in 1988, four years after their previous studio album, Savage Amusement represented a more polished and mature sound similar to the style Def Leppard had found success with. The album sold well but was considered somewhat of a critical disappointment. However, British heavy rock magazine Kerrang! did award the album five K's out of five.

On the Savage Amusement tour in 1988, the Scorpions became only the second Western group (not American) to play in the Soviet Union. Uriah Heep had performed in December 1987 in Leningrad. The following year the band returned to perform at the Moscow Music Peace Festival. As a result, the Scorpions developed an extended Russian fan base and still return to perform. Also in 1989, Scorpions released the compilation album Best of Rockers 'n' Ballads, which, in addition to the band's hits from 1979 to 1988, included several rare or previously unreleased tracks: "Hey You", from the Animal Magnetism sessions; a remixed version of "Is There Anybody There?"; and a cover of The Who's "I Can't Explain", which was also included on that same year's Stairway to Heaven/Highway to Hell charity compilation album. This is the Scorpions' only compilation album to be certified platinum in the United States.

Wishing to distance themselves from the Savage Amusement style, the band separated from their long-time producer and "Sixth Scorpion", Dieter Dierks, replacing him with Keith Olsen when they returned to the studio in 1990. Crazy World was released that year and displayed a less polished sound. The album was propelled in large part by the massive success of the ballad "Wind of Change". The song muses on the socio-political changes that were occurring in Eastern Europe and other parts of the world at the end of the Cold War. Crazy World is the band's last album to receive gold or platinum certification in the United States. On 21 July 1990, they joined many other guests for Roger Waters' massive performance of The Wall in Berlin. Scorpions performed both versions of "In the Flesh" from The Wall.

After the Crazy World tour Francis Buchholz, the band's long-serving bassist, left the group.

Later days (1993–2009)
In 1993, the Scorpions released Face the Heat. Bass was handled by Ralph Rieckermann. For the recording process, the band brought in producer Bruce Fairbairn. The album's sound was more metal than melodic. Neither the heavy metal single "Alien Nation" nor the ballad "Under the Same Sun" came close to matching the success of "Wind of Change". Face the Heat was a moderate success. In 1995, a new album, Live Bites, was produced. The disc documented retro live performances from their Savage Amusement Tour in 1988, all the way through the Face the Heat Tour in 1994. While the album had a technologically cleaner sound in comparison to their best-selling live album, World Wide Live, it was not as successful.

Prior to recording their 13th studio album, 1996's Pure Instinct, drummer Herman Rarebell left the band to set up a recording label. Curt Cress took charge of the drumsticks for the album before Louisville, Kentucky-born James Kottak took over permanently. The album had many ballads. Still, the album's singles "Wild Child" and the soothing ballad "You and I" both enjoyed moderate success.

1999 saw the release of Eye II Eye and a significant change in the band's style, mixing in elements of pop and techno. While the album was slickly produced, it was not received well by fans. The video to the album's first European single, "To Be No. 1", featured a Monica Lewinsky look-alike which did little to improve its popularity.

The following year, the Scorpions had an artistic collaboration with the Berlin Philharmonic that resulted in a 10-song album named Moment of Glory. The album went a long way toward rebuilding the band's reputation after the harsh criticism of Eye II Eye. However, critics accused them of following on the coattails of Metallica's similar collaboration (S&M) with the San Francisco Symphony which had been released the previous year, even though the orchestra had first approached the Scorpions with the idea in 1995.

In 2001, the Scorpions released Acoustica, a live unplugged album featuring acoustic reworkings of the band's biggest hits, plus new tracks. While appreciated by fans, the lack of a new studio album was frustrating to some, and Acoustica did little to return the band to the spotlight.

In 2004, the band released Unbreakable, an album that was hailed by critics as a long-awaited return to form. The album was the heaviest the band had released since Face the Heat. Whether a result of poor promotion by the band's label or the long time between studio releases, Unbreakable received little airplay and did not chart. Scorpions toured extensively behind the album and played as "Special Guests" with Judas Priest during the 2005 British tour—these were the Scorpions' first dates in the UK since 1999.

In early 2006, the Scorpions released the DVD 1 Night in Vienna that included 14 live tracks and a complete rockumentary. In LA, the band spent about four months in the studio with producers James Michael and Desmond Child working on a concept album titled Humanity: Hour I, which was released in late May 2007, and was followed by the "Humanity World Tour".

In 2007, the band collaborated with two of their signature tracks in the video game series, Guitar Hero. "No One Like You" was featured on the Rocks the '80s version of the game while "Rock You Like A Hurricane" was released on Guitar Hero 3: Legends of Rock.

On 14 May 2007, the Scorpions released Humanity – Hour I in Europe. Humanity – Hour I became available in the U.S. on 28 August on New Door Records, entering the Billboard charts at number No. 63.

In a September 2007 podcast interview, Meine said the album was not so much a "concept album", but rather a collection of songs with a common theme. "We didn't want to make another record with songs about boys chasing girls. I mean, come on, give me a break," Meine said.

Asked in 2007 if the band was planning to release a Humanity – Hour II, Meine replied:

On 20 December 2007, the Scorpions played at a concert for the elite of Russia's security forces in the Kremlin. The concert was a celebration of the 90th anniversary of the founding of the Cheka—predecessor of the KGB. The band claimed they thought they were performing a Christmas concert. They said their concert was by no means a tribute to the Cheka, communism, or Russia's brutal past. Members of the audience included Vladimir Putin and Dmitry Medvedev.

On 22 February 2009, the band received Germany's ECHO Honorary Award for lifetime achievement at Berlin's O2 World.

Sting in the Tail, Comeblack, and touring (2010–2014)
In November 2009, the Scorpions announced their 17th studio album, Sting in the Tail, would be released in early 2010, recorded in Hanover with Swedish producers Mikael "Nord" Andersson and Martin Hansen. It was released on 23 March 2010.

On 24 January 2010, the band announced their initial intentions for Sting in the Tail to be their last album, and the tour supporting it their final tour, although the band later made the decision to continue recording past the end of the tour. Dokken was scheduled to open for them but cancelled after a dispute.

On 6 April 2010, they were enshrined in Hollywood's Rock Walk in a handprint ceremony, with the band members placing their hands in a long slab of wet cement next to other musical artists.

An album of re-recordings of older songs, Comeblack, was released on 7 November 2011.

Meine was asked in a July 2011 interview about the future of the Scorpions. He replied, "Our newest project comes out in the next few months. It gives you a chance to experience the Scorpions in 3D. You can actually feel the smoke string out of the guitar like it is a live show. It is an incredible experience. The DVD features our concerts in 3D in Germany. We are just about to do the mix and it should be in the Middle East and Saudi Arabia hopefully soon. Indeed, the strong 3D technology makes us feel like pioneers after all these years (he says, laughing). We have an album coming out later this year featuring classics. You know our love for them. The '60s was the era for our inspiration. Our movie/documentary also is soon to be released. We have cameras with us on tours, so this documentary is being made during our tours. It also gives you a picture of the Scorpions career and journey."

Despite initial plans for a break up or retirement, guitarist Matthias Jabs told AZ Central on 12 June 2012 that the Scorpions would not split up. A month later, Jabs told Billboard magazine the band had been working on an album that would contain unreleased songs they recorded for the albums Blackout, Love at First Sting, Savage Amusement, and Crazy World and planned to release it in 2014. In April, the Scorpions announced shows in Russia and Belarus with an orchestra in October 2013. On 11, 12, and 14 September 2013, the band played three MTV Unplugged concerts at the Lycabettus-Theatre in Athens. On 6 November 2013, they announced four more MTV Unplugged Concert in Germany 2014. In December 2013, in an interview at Rock Show radio program in Greece, Meine said he was not sure if the album with unreleased songs they recorded for the albums Blackout, Love at First Sting, Savage Amusement and Crazy World would be released in 2014 or later on.

In 2014, the Scorpions were nominated for two Echo Awards ("Euro Grammys") for their MTV Unplugged.

In 2013, the band released the album MTV Unplugged in Athens. The album featured classic songs like Rock You Like a Hurricane and Big City Nights done acoustically, but also included rare live performances of songs like When The Smoke Is Going Down and Where the River Flows.
On 16 August 2014, they announced a new album in the works, due for release sometime in 2015.

50th anniversary and Return to Forever (2015–2017)

On 23 October 2014, Meine spoke to the band's French fan-club Crazyscorps, and announced the new record would be published in February or March 2015, to coincide with the band's 50th anniversary. Contrary to what the band said in 2013, the new album presented not only newly recorded versions of never-published songs, but also new material, written between 2011 and 2014.
The album was recorded in Sweden, with producers Martin Hansen and Mikael Nord Andersson. Drummer James Kottak, who left the band in May 2014 for rehab, returned to play drums. The new album Return to Forever was released on 20 February 2015.

On 29 August 2015, the Scorpions announced 50th anniversary deluxe editions of their albums Taken By Force, Tokyo Tapes, Lovedrive, Animal Magnetism, Blackout, Love at First Sting, World Wide Live, and Savage Amusement which were released 6 November 2015. These deluxe releases include "dozens of unreleased songs, alternate versions of big hits, rough mixes, and rare live concert recordings". On 28 April 2016, it was announced that Motörhead drummer Mikkey Dee would fill in for James Kottak and play drums on 12 North American headlining dates, including a run of shows at the Hard Rock Hotel in Las Vegas dubbed "Scorpions Blacked Out in Las Vegas" with Queensrÿche opening the Vegas shows, and dates in São Paulo. On 12 September 2016, Dee was officially announced as the band's new permanent drummer.

On 18 January 2017, the Scorpions were inducted into the Hall of Heavy Metal History for leading the two-guitar attack in heavy metal. Proceeds from the ceremony benefitted the Ronnie James Dio Stand Up and Shout Cancer Fund.

Rock Believer (2018–present)
In an August 2018 interview with Digital Journal, Scorpions guitarist Rudolf Schenker stated that the band was open to the idea of recording a follow-up to Return to Forever. He explained: "We are still waiting for a moment for inspiration to do another album, like Judas Priest and Metallica did. You have to wait until the time is right." Klaus Meine hinted in May 2019 that "there might be a new album out in 2020."

On 28 April 2020, Scorpions released (on their YouTube channel) a new (2-minute 16-second short) song entitled "Sign of Hope", inspired by the COVID-19 pandemic.

On 25 July 2020, Scorpions entered Peppermint Park Studios in Hanover to resume working on their nineteenth studio album. The album's initial sessions, which were supposed to take place in Los Angeles, were done remotely, with producer Greg Fidelman participating via Zoom; however, drummer Mikkey Dee confirmed in a March 2021 interview with Robb Flynn of Machine Head that the band had to abandon their plans to work with Fidelman, due to the COVID-19 pandemic. Progress on the album had continued to be slow by August 2021, when Scorpions posted a video on Facebook from the studio where they rehearsed a new song (possibly titled "Seventh Sun") for an upcoming tour.

On 29 September 2021, Scorpions announced Rock Believer as the title of their nineteenth studio album and set 11 February 2022 as its release date; the band later pushed back the release of the album to two weeks after its initially planned release date. They will support the album with a European tour with Mammoth WVH and a North American tour with Thundermother and Whitesnake, as part of the latter's farewell tour.

Legacy
Scorpions are one of the best-selling bands in the history of music, according to various sources, the band's sales are about 100 million worldwide, of which 10.5 million are certified in the United States. All their editions with issued sales certificates have repeatedly reached gold and platinum status in various countries around the world. Rolling Stone describes Scorpions as the "heroes of heavy metal", and MTV called them "Ambassadors of Rock". They have received prestigious awards such as three World Music Awards, a star on the Hollywood Rock wall, and a presence in the permanent exhibition of the Rock and Roll Hall of Fame. In 2015, the group celebrated its 50th anniversary.

Influence
Scorpions have been cited as a principal influence on the 1980s hard rock and heavy metal scenes, including artists such as Guns N' Roses, Mötley Crüe, Def Leppard, Metallica, Megadeth, Testament, Skid Row, Cinderella, Doro, Helloween, Hanoi Rocks, and Yngwie Malmsteen.

In popular culture
"Wind of Change" is played in the off-Broadway production Power Balladz.

"Wind of Change" is a podcast from Pineapple Street Studios, Crooked Media and Spotify that explores a rumor that the song was actually written by the CIA.

Band members

Current members
Rudolf Schenker – rhythm guitar, backing vocals (1965–present)
Klaus Meine – lead vocals (1969–present)
Matthias Jabs – lead guitar, backing vocals (1978–present)
Paweł Mąciwoda – bass, backing vocals (2003–present)
Mikkey Dee – drums (2016–present)

Awards and honours
 1975: Best German Live Band
 1976: Album of the Year in Germany – Virgin Killer
 1979: Playboy magazine: Best artwork of the year for the Lovedrive cover
 1985: Entry into the Golden Book of Hanover
 1986: Bravo Otto Band in Silver Category, Hard & Heavy
 1991: Bravo Otto in Gold Category band, Hard & Heavy
 1991: Invitation to the Kremlin, reception in the former Soviet state with party leader Mikhail Gorbachev
 1992: Bravo Otto in bronze category band, Hard & Heavy
 1992: World Music Award as the most successful German rock act
 1992: Echo as the best national group
 1992: Europe Golden (German: Goldene Europa)
 1994: World Music Award
 1998: Radio Regenbogen Award, Rock International
 2000: Town of Hanover Plaque (German: Stadtplakette)
 2000: Entry into the Golden Book of Hanover
 2000: Cultural Prize of the City of Hanover
 2001: Scorpions Street in Leganes, Spain
 2009: Echo Lifetime Achievement award
 2010: Star on the Hollywood Rock Walk, Los Angeles
 2010: Rock Legend Award – the World Music Award (special award for outstanding contribution to the development of rock music)
 2010: Special postage stamp Scorpions for the Brazil tour, published by the Brazilian postal service
 2010: Lifetime Achievement Awards, the Hard Rock Cafe chain
 2011: Radio Regenbogen Award in the category  Lifetime Rock
 2011: Pioneer of Pop – awarded by SWR3-New-Pop-Festival
 2011: Metal Guru Award from Classic Rock magazine
 2012: CGDC Award for Music for Dialogue from the Center for Global Dialogue and Cooperation (CGDC)
 2012: Deutscher Nachhaltigkeitspreis der Städte und Gemeinden
 2013: Steiger Award
 2017: 6 th of October is the "Scorpions Day" of the City of Los Angeles
 2017: Hall of Heavy Metal History, Anaheim, California

Discography

Studio albums

 Lonesome Crow (1972)
 Fly to the Rainbow (1974)
 In Trance (1975)
 Virgin Killer (1976)
 Taken by Force (1977)
 Lovedrive (1979)
 Animal Magnetism (1980)
 Blackout (1982)
 Love at First Sting (1984)
 Savage Amusement (1988)
 Crazy World (1990)
 Face the Heat (1993)
 Pure Instinct (1996)
 Eye II Eye (1999)
 Unbreakable (2004)
 Humanity: Hour I (2007)
 Sting in the Tail (2010)
 Return to Forever (2015)
 Rock Believer (2022)

Tours
The Scorpions have played around 5,000 concerts in over 80 countries.

1972–1974: Lonesome Crow Tour
1974–1975: Fly to the Rainbow Tour
1975–1976: In Trance Tour
1976–1977: Virgin Killer Tour
1977–1978: Taken by Force Tour
1979: Lovedrive Tour
1980: Animal Magnetism Tour
1982–1983: Blackout Tour
1984–1986: Love at First Sting Tour
1988–1989: Savage Amusement Tour
1990–1991: Crazy World Tour
1993–1994: Face the Heat Tour
1996–1998: Pure Instinct Tour
1999: Eye to Eye Tour
2000–2001: Moment of Glory Tour
2001: Acoustica Tour
2002–2003: Bad for Good Tour
2004–2006: Unbreakable Tour
2007–2009: Humanity Tour
2010–2014: Get Your Sting and Blackout World Tour
 March 2010 – October 2011: Get Your Sting and Blackout
 November 2011 – December 2012: Final Sting
 July 2013 – November 2014: Rock 'n' Roll Forever Tour
2015–2016: 50th Anniversary World Tour
2017–2020: 2017–2020 Crazy World Tour
2022–2023: Rock Believer Tour

Concert residencies
2022: Sin City Nights at Zappo Theater from Planet Hollywood Resort Las Vegas

See also
List of artists who reached number one on the U.S. Mainstream Rock chart
List of glam metal bands and artists
List of heavy metal bands
List of hard rock musicians (N–Z)

References

Citations

Sources 
 Weinstein, Deena. Heavy Metal: The Music and its Culture. DaCapo, 2000. , pp. 29, 36.

Bibliography

External links

 
 
 Worldwide Fan Club (archived)
 Crazy Scorps French Fanclub (archived) | Facebook

 
1965 establishments in West Germany
Articles which contain graphical timelines
EMI Classics and Virgin Classics artists
English-language singers from Germany
German glam metal musical groups
German hard rock musical groups
German heavy metal musical groups
Harvest Records artists
Mercury Records artists
Musical groups established in 1965
Musical groups from Hanover
Musical quintets
RCA Records artists
Vertigo Records artists
East West Records artists
Brain Records artists
Ariola Records artists
Sibling musical groups